The Municipality of Križevci is a municipality in the Prlekija region in eastern Slovenia. It gets its name from the largest settlement and administrative seat of the municipality, Križevci pri Ljutomeru. It is part of the traditional region of Styria and is now included in the Mura Statistical Region.

Settlements
In addition to the municipal seat of Križevci pri Ljutomeru, the municipality also includes the following settlements:

 Berkovci
 Berkovski Prelogi
 Boreci
 Bučečovci
 Dobrava
 Gajševci
 Grabe pri Ljutomeru
 Iljaševci
 Ključarovci pri Ljutomeru
 Kokoriči
 Logarovci
 Lukavci
 Stara Nova Vas
 Vučja Vas
 Zasadi

References

External links

Municipality of Križevci on Geopedia
Križevci municipal site

Krizevci
1998 establishments in Slovenia